The 1975–76 Iraqi National Clubs First Division was the 2nd season of the competition since its foundation in 1974. Newly-promoted club Al-Zawraa, founded in 1969, won the league title and also won the Iraq FA Cup to complete the first national double in Iraqi football. Al-Zawraa's squad included many of the players that played for Al-Naqil in the 1974–75 season, a club that folded due to financial difficulties after finishing as league runners-up that campaign.

League table

Results

Season statistics

Top scorers

Hat-tricks

References

External links
 Iraq Football Association

Iraqi Premier League seasons
Iraq
1